Princess Maria-Olympia of Greece and Denmark (born 25 July 1996) is a fashion model, socialite and member of the non-reigning Greek royal family. She is the oldest child and only daughter of Pavlos, Crown Prince of Greece, and his wife, Marie-Chantal Miller. Her paternal grandparents are Constantine II of Greece and Anne-Marie of Denmark, who were the last King and Queen of the Hellenes, while her maternal grandfather is duty free entrepreneur Robert Warren Miller.

Early life 
Princess Maria-Olympia of Greece and Denmark was born on 25 July 1996 at Weill Cornell Medical Center in New York City to Pavlos, Crown Prince of Greece, and his wife, Marie-Chantal. She was baptized in the Greek Orthodox Church by Patriarch Bartholomew I of Constantinople at the Church of St. George in Istanbul, Turkey, on 22 December 1996. Her godparents are her paternal aunt Princess Alexia of Greece and Denmark, her maternal aunt Pia Getty, her grandfather's second cousin Charles III, and Prince Michael of Greece and Denmark. Her family relocated to London, where she spent most of her childhood. She is the older sister of Prince Constantine-Alexios, Prince Achileas-Andreas, Prince Odysseas Kimon, and Prince Aristidis-Stavros.

The princess herself uses the name Olympia in everyday life.

Olympia of Greece attended her first couture show around the age of 11 in Rome together with her parents.

She studied art history, theatre, photography, and graphic design while in boarding school in Switzerland with hopes of pursuing a career in art or fashion. She interned in Dior's couture department, at the age of 17.

Personal life 

In 2016, Maria-Olympia studied photography at Parsons School of Design in New York. It was reported that she was romantically involved with her godfather's son Prince Harry, but a senior official representative of the British Royal Family denied the rumors. In April 2016, Maria-Olympia posed alongside two of her first cousins, Isabel Getty and Princess Talita von Fürstenberg in a Vanity Fair feature. As of 2021 she is in a relationship with Peregrine Pearson, the son and heir of Michael Pearson, 4th Viscount Cowdray.

She revealed she has dyslexia in an interview with Tatler.

Maria-Olympia registered at college in New York in the fall of 2015. In 2019 she completed her studies with a degree from New York University's Gallatin School of Individualized Study in Fashion Business and Marketing.

Fashion career 
She has modeled for Teen Vogue, Town & Country, Tatler, Hello!, ¡Hola!, and W. In June 2017, Maria-Olympia walked the runway for Dolce & Gabbana. She has also modeled for Michael Kors. She became the face for Pretty Ballerinas's Spring/Summer 2019 collection.

Using her name Olympia the Saks Potts S/S 2019 show during Copenhagen Fashion Week in August 2018 was named OLYMPIA after her and opened by the princess herself as the first model on the stage.

Titles and styles 
25 July 1996 – present: Her Royal Highness Princess Maria-Olympia of Greece and Denmark

Honours 

  Greek Royal Family 
 Dame Grand Cross, 1st Class of the Order of Saints Olga and Sophia

Ancestry

References 

1996 births
Living people
American bloggers
American female models
American people of Danish descent
American people of Greek descent
American socialites
American women bloggers
Danish princesses
Fashion influencers
Female models from New York (state)
Greek Orthodox Christians from the United States
Greek princesses
House of Glücksburg (Greece)
Miller family
Models from New York City
New York University alumni
Parsons School of Design alumni
People from Manhattan
Royalty and nobility with dyslexia
21st-century American women